Paamiut, formerly Frederikshåb, is a town in southwestern Greenland in the Sermersooq municipality.

Geography 

Paamiut is located on the coast of Labrador Sea in the southern end of a small estuary called Kuannersooq ("Inlet").

History 

People have lived in the Paamiut area since around 1500 BC . The name Paamiut is Kalaallisut for "Those who Reside by the Mouth (of the fiord)".

The trading post of Frederikshaab (sometimes anglicized as Frederick's Hope) was established by Jacob Severin's company in 1742 and named in honor of the Crown Prince Frederick (later King Frederick V of Denmark).

The community prospered on trading fur and whale products. It also became known for its soapstone artists. The town has one of the finest churches in Greenland, built in 1909 from wood in the Norwegian style.

Following the warming climatic trends since the 1920s, Paamiut developed a booming cod industry between the 1950s and 1989, when the stock dwindled. In connection with a development plan called G60, Paamiut was chosen as to be the place to live for the entire population of the former Paamiut municipality. Therefore, the number of people living there rose significantly during that period.

There is local museum downtown in original buildings from the previous century, among them a carpenter workshop and a salt warehouse. The Danish Crown Princely family visited the town as part of an official tour of Greenland in summer 2014.

Economy 
As is the case for other towns of western Greenland, the sea is free of ice during the winter, while fishing is the primary occupation of the inhabitants of the region. Icebergs, coming adrift along the east coast of Greenland with the East Greenland Current and continuing up along the west coast with the West Greenland Current normally arrive in the autumn, bringing numerous seals marking this season as a great time for the local hunters.

Population 
With 1,308 inhabitants as of 2020, it is the tenth-largest town in Greenland, down from the seventh in 2005. Paamiut has been losing population for almost every year in the last two decades: more than 31% relative to 1990 levels, almost 20% relative to 2000, and more than 16% relative to 2005.

Transport 
Paamiut is a port of call for the Arctic Umiaq ferry service. In November 2007, the Paamiut Airport was built by Mittarfeqarfiit. Connections to Nuuk and Narsarsuaq are served by Air Greenland STOL aircraft.

Climate

Like other coastal areas of Greenland, Paamiut has a typical tundra climate (Köppen climate classification ET), with cold winters and cool summers.

Paamiut receives  of precipitation over 119.9 precipitation days and 87.1 snowy days. Precipitation is evenly distributed throughout the year. August, the wettest month, receives  of rainfall over 10 precipitation days, although other months have more precipitation days. January has the most snowy days with 12.7 snowy days.

References

Populated places in Greenland
Populated places established in 1742
1742 establishments in the Danish colonial empire
1742 establishments in North America
18th-century establishments in Greenland